Puratrophin-1 is a protein that in humans is encoded by the PLEKHG4 gene.

References

Further reading